Calyptra is a genus of fungi in the class Dothideomycetes. The relationship of this taxon to other taxa within the class is unknown (incertae sedis).

See also 
List of Dothideomycetes genera incertae sedis

References 

Dothideomycetes enigmatic taxa
Dothideomycetes genera
Taxa named by Ferdinand Theissen
Taxa named by Hans Sydow
Taxa described in 1918